Daniel Ellis Medlin (born October 12, 1949) is a former American football Guard who played for the Oakland Raiders of the National Football League (NFL) between 1974 and 1976 and again in 1979.  He also played for the Tampa Bay Buccaneers between 1977 and 1978.  He played 76 games in 6 seasons in the NFL.  He was a member of the 1976 Super Bowl champion Oakland Raiders.

References

1949 births
Living people
Sportspeople from High Point, North Carolina
Players of American football from North Carolina
American football offensive guards
NC State Wolfpack football players
Oakland Raiders players
Tampa Bay Buccaneers players